Liu Wanting and Lu Jingjing were the defending champions, but lost in the final to the wildcard pairing of Li Yihong and Wang Yan, 1–6, 6–0, [10–4].

Seeds

Draw

References 
 Draw

Tianjin Health Industry Park - Doubles
Tianjin Health Industry Park